"Winner Take All" is a Sailor Steve Costigan short story by Robert E. Howard.  It was originally published in the July 1930 issue of Fight Stories. Howard earned $80 for the sale of this story which is now in the public domain.

It is also known as "Sucker Fight" after being published under that name in the Winter 1939-1940 issue of Fight Stories, with the authorship attributed to the pseudonym Mark Adams.

References

External links

 List of stories and publication details at Howard Works

Short stories by Robert E. Howard
Pulp stories
1930 short stories
Short stories about boxing
Works originally published in Fight Stories
Works published under a pseudonym